The Smile Sprint Stakes is a Grade III American Thoroughbred horse race for horses aged three and older over a distance of six furlongs on the dirt run annually in early July at Gulfstream Park in Hallandale Beach, Florida.

History

The race has its origins in what is considered the inaugural running on 8 September 1984 as the Miami Beach Handicap. However, an event with that name was held in 1973 and 1974 but was a two year old race over a distance of a  mile.

The following year the event was run over a slightly longer distance of 7 furlongs. In 1989 the event was run over 6 furlongs and in 1992 the event was run over a distance of a  furlongs.

In 1993 the event was renamed to the Miami Beach Sprint Handicap.

In 1999 the event was renamed to the Smile Sprint Handicap to honor Frances A. Genter Stable's Florida-bred colt, Smile. As a two-year-old in 1984, Smile became the first horse to win all three races in the Florida Stallion Stakes series at Calder Race Course. He went on to win the 1986 Breeders' Cup Sprint and was voted that year's  American Champion Sprint Horse.

In 2003, the event was upgraded to Grade III status by the Thoroughbred Owners and Breeders Association and carried a $500,000 purse. Two years later the event was upgraded again to Grade II.

At times the event was part of the Breeders' Cup Challenge series, with the winner automatically qualifying for the Breeders' Cup Sprint.

In 2014 the event was not held and after negotiations between Calder Race Track and Gulfstream Park the event was moved to Gulfstream Park. 

The event was modified to the Smile Sprint Stakes for the 2015 running when the conditions of the event were changed from handicap to stakes allowance. 

In 2017 the event was downgraded back to Grade III.

Since 2021 the event has been an invitational event.

Records
Speed record:  
6 furlongs: – 1:08.82 Cool Arrow (2020)
7 furlongs: – 1:21.82 Constant Escort (1996)

Margins:
 lengths – Shake You Down (2003)

Most wins:
 No horse has won this race more than once.

Most wins by a jockey:
 2 –  Ricardo D. Lopez  (1992, 1993)
 2 –  Wigberto Ramos  (1994, 1998)
 2 – Mike Smith (2002, 2005)
 2 – Eibar Coa (1999, 2010)
 2 – Javier Castellano (2000, 2017)
 2 – Emisael Jaramillo (2016, 2018)

Most wins by a trainer:
 3 –  David Fawkes  (2000, 2010, 2013)

Most wins by an owner:
 No owner has won this race more than once.

Winners 

Notes:

ƒ Filly or Mare

See also
List of American and Canadian Graded races

References

Graded stakes races in the United States
Grade 3 stakes races in the United States
Open sprint category horse races
Horse races in Florida
Recurring sporting events established in 1984
Gulfstream Park
1984 establishments in Florida